Castelo de Alfaiates is a castle in Sabugal Municipality, Portugal. It is classified by IGESPAR as a Site of Public Interest.

Alfaiates
Alfaiates
National monuments in Guarda District